Reinhold Beckmann (born 23 February 1956) is a German journalist and television presenter.

He was born in Twistringen, Lower Saxony. After school in Syke, he studied German, film and theatre in Cologne.

In 1980, Beckmann began to work for broadcaster WDR, in programs such as Aktuelle Stunde. As a sports journalist, he worked for Premiere from 1990 to 1992. He then joined Sat.1, again as a sportscaster (in programs such as ran and ranissimo). From 1998, Beckmann worked for ARD, in programs such as Sportschau and has his own talkshow Beckmann. He retired on 6 May 2017.

Beckmann and his family live in Hamburg. He is married, with two children.

Awards 

 1995: Bayerischer Fernsehpreis
 1995: Goldene Kamera
 1995: Romy

References

External links 

 Official website

1956 births
Living people
People from Diepholz (district)
German male journalists
German journalists
German television presenters
German sports journalists
German sports broadcasters
German television talk show hosts
German male writers
ARD (broadcaster) people
Sat.1 people
Westdeutscher Rundfunk people
Norddeutscher Rundfunk people